Hasanjan Kuh (also Romanized as Ḩasanjān Kūh and Ḩasanjānkūh) is a village in Razliq Rural District, in the Central District of Sarab County, East Azerbaijan Province, Iran. At the 2006 census, its population was 157, in 34 families.

References 

Populated places in Sarab County